A list of Spanish-produced and co-produced feature films released in Spain in 2000. When applicable, the domestic theatrical release date is favoured.

Films

Box office 
The ten highest-grossing Spanish films in 2000, by domestic box office gross revenue, are as follows:

See also 
 15th Goya Awards

References 
Informational notes

Citations

External links
 Spanish films of 2000 at the Internet Movie Database

2000
Spanish
Films